String Quartet No. 2 in G minor "A Maori Legend in Four Scenes", Stiles 1.2.3.3 SQ2, often called "Maori Quartet", was composed by Alfred Hill in 1907–1911 and premiered immediately in 1911. It is dedicated to Earnest [sic] Wunderlich — "in slight appreciation". The first two quartets were published together by Breitkopf & Härtel in 1913 (no full score, only parts). Each of them used to be referred as Maori, a feature that can lead to confusion. Today the first one is called Maori, while for the second the longer subtitle is retained.

The Second is one of Hill's most notable quartets (along with the Eleventh). Its approximate duration is 19–22 minutes.

History 
On 15 April 1907 the last concert of the Christchurch International Exhibition 1906–1907 was held. After this Hill went to Hampden in the South Island for a vacation, where he began composing the quartet. According to the note on the manuscript, it was finished only four years later, on 26 August 1911. A non-final version premiered by Austral String Quartet two months earlier, on 1 July, in St. James' Hall, Sydney. This happened just a few weeks after the first performance of Hill's First Quartet (18 May 1911). The score was further revised by the composer, and the premier performance of the final version was held by the Austral String Quartet in Sydney on 6 September. On 31 October it was played by Francis Mowat Carter, the composer, Stephen Vost Janssen and Bryce Carter during a farewell concerto to Mowat Carter, as he was going to further his studies in Vienna.

It is unknown how much of the quartet was written in 1907, but it appears that Hill was impelled to complete it when he felt there was a performing opportunity by the newly-established (1910) Austral String Quartet.

Although the program uses a Māori legend, none of the themes is indicated as an original Māori melody (as it is in Hill's cantata Hinemoa, Violin Sonata No. 4 and String Quartet No. 1). It is unlikely that this quartet contain any direct reference to a specific Māori tune, but certain characteristics of Māori music can be found in the piece.

Program 
Hill claims that the program of the quartet is based on a Māori legend. It is provided by him as follows.

Structure 
The quartet is laid out in four movements corresponding to the four scenes of its program.

I. The Forest. Allegro agitato (G minor)
a) The fight of the Crane and the Monster
b) Rata enters the wood
II. The Dream. Adagio (A-flat major)
III. The Karakia (Scherzo). The karakia (incantation) and the coming of the birds. Adagio — Presto (G minor)
IV. The Dedication (Finale). The dedication and launching of the canoe. Poco adagio — Allegro (G major)

Hill's music notes 
In addition to the general program Hill wrote music notes for all the four movements.

Editions 
 Alfred Hill. String Quartet No.2 in A Minor "A Maori legend in four scenes for string quartet". Narara, N.S.W.: Stiles Music Publications, 2006 (ISMN 979-0-720029-80-1)

Recordings 
 (rec. between 1945–1952) Queensland State String Quartet (Ernest Llewellyn, Harold Tabener, David Powell, Don Howley) — (remastered version, 1996) Canberra: Canberra School of Music (Chamber music made and played in Australia, 1945–1952)
 (rec. ca.1962) Austral String Quartet (1950s-1970s) — (LP) Festival Records FC 30,802; reissue: (LP, 1980s) St. Leonards, N.S.W.: Universal Record Club UC-586
 (rec. 2006) Dominion String Quartet – (2007) Naxos Records 8.570491.

Further reading 
 Lam, Y. C. (June 2006). Analytical study of Alfred Hill’s String Quartet no. 2 in G minor (Thesis, Master of Arts). University of Otago.

References

External links 

Edition Silvertrust page
A review of February 1920 performance in Dunedin by Verbrugghen String Quartet

String quartets by Alfred Hill
1911 compositions
Compositions in G minor